Trichomycterus chaberti is a species of cave-dwelling pencil catfish endemic to Bolivia.

References
 
 

Fish of South America
Fish of Bolivia
chaberti
Endemic fauna of Bolivia
Taxonomy articles created by Polbot
Fish described in 1968